is a  single by Japanese pop singer and songwriter Miho Komatsu released under Giza studio label. It was released 26 November 2003. The single reached #30 in its first week and sold 5,642 copies. It charted for 3 weeks and sold 6,278 copies in total.

Track list
All songs are written and composed by Miho Komatsu with except in track No.3 (assistance)

arrangement: Hirohito Furui (Garnet Crow)
"I'll tell you"
arrangement: Hitoshi Okamoto (Garnet Crow)
 
lyrics: Kazuo Yoshie / arrangement: Daisuke Ikeda
DEEN's "Tooi Sora de"(遠い空で) self-cover
 (instrumental)

References 

2003 singles
Miho Komatsu songs
Songs written by Miho Komatsu
2003 songs
Giza Studio singles
Being Inc. singles
Song recordings produced by Daiko Nagato